Kanal 9 is one of three regional television stations in Šumadija and Pomoravlje Region, operating in Kragujevac, Serbia. The company started operating in 1994.

External links

 

Television stations in Serbia
Mass media in Kragujevac
1994 establishments in Serbia
Television channels and stations established in 1994